Journeys into the Ring of Fire is BBC documentary series that first aired in 2006 on BBC One and has subsequently been rerun several times on BBC Four. In this series of four programmes, presenter geologist Professor Iain Stewart travels to four locations on the Pacific Rim to discover how geology has shaped human history and culture in these regions. The series was produced by Jeremy Phillips and was a BBC and Science Channel co-production.

Episodes

References

External links
 
 

2006 British television series debuts
2006 British television series endings
BBC television documentaries about science
British television documentaries
English-language television shows